Wendouree was a steel steamship built as a collier by S & H Morton & Co., Leith, Scotland for Huddart Parker & Co. Pty. Ltd. She was later refitted to carry passengers for the Melbourne to Sydney run.

Fate
She was wrecked on the Oyster Bank at the mouth of the Hunter River while leaving Newcastle for Adelaide on 20 July 1898. She was carrying 1850 tons of coal and grounded on a bar.

References

Further reading 
Online Databases
Australian National Shipwreck Database
Australian Shipping - Arrivals and Departures 1788-1968 including shipwrecks 
Encyclopaedia of Australian Shipwrecks - New South Wales Shipwrecks 

Books
Wrecks on the New South Wales Coast. By Loney, J. K. (Jack Kenneth), 1925–1995 Oceans Enterprises. 1993 . 
Australian shipwrecks Vol. 3 1871–1900 By Loney, J. K. (Jack Kenneth), 1925–1995. Geelong Vic: List Publishing, 1982 910.4530994 LON

Shipwrecks of the Hunter Region
Ships built in Leith
1882 ships
Maritime incidents in 1898
1898 in Australia
1871–1900 ships of Australia
Colliers of Australia
Iron and steel steamships of Australia